The 2023 Indian Ocean Island Games will be the 11th edition of this multi-sport event for athletes representing the National Olympic Committees of Indian Ocean island nations, in Madagascar.  The original hosts were Maldives, but they withdrew from hosting in January 2021 and were replaced by Madagascar.

The Games

Participating IOCs
Over 2,000 athletes from seven countries will participate in the 2023 Indian Ocean Island Games.

References

External links 

Indian Ocean Island Games
Indian Ocean Island Games
Indian Ocean Island Games
Indian Ocean Island Games